Jeunesse Sportive Madinet Skikda, known as JSM Skikda or simply JSMS  for short, is a football club, The club is based in the city of Skikda. The club was founded in 1936 and its colours are black and white. Their home stadium, 20 August 1955 Stadium, has a capacity of 30,000 spectators. The club is currently playing in the Algerian Ligue 2.

Honours
 Algerian Cup: Runners-up: 1967.

 Ligue 2: Winners (4): 1965, 1967, 1987 and 2020.

 DNA / Ligue 3: Winners (4): 1998, 2000, 2008 and 2015.

 Algerian Cup (Juniors): Runners-up: 1968.

 Algerian Cup (Cadet): Runners-up: 1974.

Personnel

Rival Clubs
  ES Collo (Derby)
  CS Constantine (Rivalry)

References

External links

Football clubs in Algeria
Association football clubs established in 1936
Jsm Skikda
Algerian Ligue 2 clubs
1936 establishments in Algeria
Sports clubs in Algeria